printk is a C function from the Linux kernel interface that prints messages to the kernel log. It accepts a string parameter called the format string, which specifies a method for rendering an arbitrary number of varied data type parameter(s) into a string. The string is then printed to the kernel log.

It provides a printf-like abstraction and its parsing of the format string and arguments behave similarly to printf. It acts as a debugging tool for kernel programmers who need this function for logging messages from the kernel.

The printk function prototype is:
int printk(const char *fmt, ...);

C standard library and its printf function is unavailable in kernel mode, hence the need for printk.

Differences from printf
The function printk is based on printf, but cannot always be used in the same way that printf is used.

Log levels
printk allows a caller to specify the type and importance of the message being sent. This specifier is called the log level.

The log level specifies the type of message being sent to the kernel message log. The log level is specified by prepending (using C's string literal concatenation) a string describing the log level to the start of the message to be produced. For example, a message could be produced at the KERN_INFO using the following:
printk(KERN_INFO "Message: %s\n", arg);

The string specifying the log level consists of the ASCII start of header character followed by a digit describing the log level or the character 'c' to indicate the message is a continuation of the previous message. The following log levels, along with their interpretations, are given below.

When a log level is not specified, the default log level is KERN_WARNING, unless a different default has been set in the kernel itself.

Log levels are defined in <linux/kern_levels.h>. Which log levels are printed is configured using the sysctl file /proc/sys/kernel/printk.

Pointer formats
The %p format specifier (used for printing pointers in printf) is extended to add additional formatting modes, for example, requesting to print a struct sockaddr * using %pISpc would print an IPv4/v6 address and port in a human-friendly format (e.g. "1.2.3.4:12345" or "[1:2:3:4:5:6:7:8]:12345").

No floating point support 
While printf support output of floating point numbers, printk does not, since the Linux kernel does not use floating point numbers within the kernel.

Description
The function tries to lock the semaphore controlling access to the system console. If it succeeds, the output is logged and the console drivers are called. If it is not possible to acquire the semaphore the output is placed into the log buffer, and the current holder of the console semaphore will notice the new output when they release the console semaphore and will send the buffered output to the console before releasing the semaphore.

One effect of this deferred printing is that code which calls printk and then changes the log levels to be printed may break. This is because the log level to be printed is inspected when the actual printing occurs.

The function printk can be called from anywhere in the kernel except during the very early stages of the kernel boot process, when the system console is not initialised. The alternative function early_printk is implemented on some architectures and is used identically to printk during the early stages of the boot process.

References

External links
 Format Reference

Linux kernel
Operating system APIs